Mandisi Sindo (born 1989, stage name Dr Disi) is a South African actor, writer, director, voice artist and dance performer, and the founder of the Theatre4Change Arts Project, KASI RC - Khayelitsha Art School and Rehabilitation Centre & Umjita Entertainment. He began pursuing his passion for theatre at age 11 in primary school, and since then has dedicated his life to the arts and to helping young people gain the skills for a tertiary level education. He views the teaching of drama as "(his) calling and weapon to teach those who are not getting the formal classroom teaching."

Career

Education
Shindo studied his (Diploma) in Theatre and Performance at the University of Cape Town majoring in Community Theatre making.

Performances
Macbeki by Pieter Dick Uys, dir by Chris Weare Uct Little Theatre and India
 Burnt By Ina and Ian Bruce
 Home Brew By Sabata Sesiu
 Opera 5:20 by Geoff Hyland Baxter 2010
 Isivuno Sama Phupha by Mandla Mbothwe
 The Lesson by Eugène Ionesco dir by Geoff Hyland performed: America Boston 2011
 Bokumka Bonke By Cast Directed By Mandla Mbothwe
 Living under pressure ( which he wrote, directed and performed)

References

Living people
1989 births
South African male stage actors
University of Cape Town alumni
21st-century South African male actors
People from the City of Cape Town